Andrey Paryvayew (born 3 January 1982) is a former Belarusian professional footballer. His last club was Isloch Minsk Raion.

Career

Club
Born in Minsk, Paryvayew has played professionally in the Belarusian Premier League, Russian First Division and Kazakhstan Premier League. He has won the Kazakh league twice with FC Shakhter Karagandy.

On 15 July 2016, Paryvayew left Isloch Minsk Raion.

In August 2016, Paryvayew was one of several Isloch Minsk Raion players alleged to be involved in match fixing during their match against Dinamo Brest on 30 April 2016.
On 20 February 2018, the BFF banned Paryvayew for life for his involvement in the match fixing between Isloch Minsk Raion and Dinamo Brest in April 2016.

International career
Paryvayew made one appearance for the Belarus national football team, a friendly against Iran in 2007.

Career statistics

Club

Honours
Dinamo Minsk
Belarusian Cup (1): 2002–03

Shakhtyor Soligorsk
Belarusian Premier League (1): 2005
Belarusian Cup (1): 2003–04

Shakhter Karagandy
Kazakhstan Premier League (2): 2011, 2012
Kazakhstan Cup (1): 2013
Kazakhstan Super Cup (1): 2013

References

External links

1982 births
Living people
Belarusian footballers
Belarusian expatriate footballers
FC Dinamo Minsk players
FC Shakhtyor Soligorsk players
FC Granit Mikashevichi players
FC Dnepr Mogilev players
FC SKA-Khabarovsk players
Expatriate footballers in Russia
Belarus international footballers
FC Vityaz Podolsk players
FC Molodechno players
FC Gorodeya players
FC Shakhter Karagandy players
Expatriate footballers in Kazakhstan
FC Dinamo-Juni Minsk players
Kazakhstan Premier League players
FC Isloch Minsk Raion players
Association football midfielders
FC Avangard Kursk players